A , sometimes called a , is the chair of a Dutch water board. The dijkgraaf is the equivalent of a mayor in local government and a King's Commissioner in provincial government, chairing both the legislative and executive council, while having both ceremonial and representational roles as well as their own portfolios. The term goes back to pre-medieval days.

The government bodies in the Netherlands today in order of rank are:
National
Provincial
Municipal
Water boards.

In medieval times and earlier however, the water boards were the same as municipal, and since it was a country of duchies, the Water board was in governmental terms the equivalent of a city, and thus also the highest form of government.

References
 Dijkgraaf definition (Dutch)
 Water Canon (English version) website of The Ministry of Transport, Public Works and Water Management
 First female dijkgraaf Joan Leemhuis-Stout (Dutch)

Government of the Netherlands
Water boards (Netherlands)